Sierra de Quila, officially the Sierra de Quila Flora and Fauna Protection Area, is a Mexican Flora and Fauna Protection Area in the state of Jalisco, Mexico. It has an area of 15,193 hectares, and is located within six municipalities: San Martín de Hidalgo, Tecolotlán, Cocula, Atengo, Tenamaxtlán, and Ameca.

The Sierra de Quila is part of the Trans-Mexican Volcanic Belt, a system of mountains that runs east–west through central Mexico. The Sierra de Quila divides the basin of the Ameca River to the north from that of the Armería River to the south.

History
In the 1950s, the inhabitants of Tecolotlán, with the leadership of Gabriel Agraz García de Alba, founded a grouping that had as its principal objective the prevention of forestal exploitation of the area. From 1970 to 1980, more manifestations regarding the prevention of irrational forestal exploitation took place which pressured the municipality of Tecolotlán to create the Pro-Conservation Committee of the Forests and Springs of the Sierra de Quila which protected the natural resources of the area and prohibited clandestine activities within the area.

Sierra de Quila became a "Forested and Faunal Protection Zone" on August 4, 1982. The area was recategorized as a flora and fauna protection area on June 7, 2000, in recognition of its biodiversity and other aspects.

Geography
The Sierra de Quila Flora and Fauna Protection Area contains the springs of La Ciénega, Charco de la Máquina, and Presa del Ahogado; the cascades of Salto de la Campana, Cascada Santa Rosa, Cascada La Ciénega, Salto de Tecolotlán, and Cascada El Columpio; and the viewpoints of Cerro El Huehuentón, Mirador Tecolotlán, and Piedras Blancas.

Flora and fauna
Pine-oak forests, including pine, oak, and mixed pine and oak forests, are the predominant vegetation at higher elevations, along with smaller areas of cloud forest. Tropical dry forest is found at lower elevations.

It has 28 species of mammals, 90 species of birds, 15 species of reptiles, 5 species of amphibians, representing 17% of the vertebrate species registered in the State of Jalisco. Large mammals include white-tailed deer (Odocoileus virginianus), collared peccary (Dicotyles tajacu), and puma (Puma concolor).

Conservation
Sierra de Quila was established as a wildlife protection zone on August 4, 1982. It was the more recent and smaller of the two wildlife protection areas in the state, the other being La Primavera (near Guadalajara). It was re-designated a flora and fauna protection area in 2000, and is managed by the National Commission of Natural Protected Areas (CONANP).

References

External links

Official Website of La Sierra de Quila

Landforms of Jalisco
Mountain ranges of Mexico
Natural history of Jalisco
Protected areas of Jalisco
Flora and fauna protection areas of Mexico
1982 establishments in Mexico
Protected areas established in 1982
Protected areas of the Trans-Mexican Volcanic Belt
Jalisco dry forests